Aleksei Khutovich Argun (Russian: Алексей Хутович Аргун; April 1937 – 1 July 2008) was Minister of Culture of the Abkhazian ASSR from 1971 or 1973 to 1980.

References

1937 births
2008 deaths
People from Tkvarcheli District
Ministers for Culture of Abkhazia